On October 23, 2014, a hatchet-wielding man, Zale H. Thompson, attacked four New York City Police Department (NYPD) officers on a crowded sidewalk in the Jamaica neighborhood of Queens, New York City. Officer Kenneth Healey was struck in the head, while Officer Joseph Meeker was injured in the arm. Also injured was a female civilian, who was struck by a stray bullet when two other officers shot and killed the perpetrator. Investigators discovered that Thompson was a recent Muslim convert. His attack was classified as an act of terrorism.

Attack
On October 23, 2014, Thompson approached a group of four New York City police officers from behind in the rain on Jamaica Avenue. He had previously been hiding behind a bus shelter. They were posing for a photograph taken by a freelance photographer on Jamaica Avenue, near Union Hall Street.

Thompson took out an 18-inch metal hatchet from a backpack, charged the group and brought it down into the back of one of the officer's heads. In the ensuing altercation, a second officer was wounded and Thompson was shot dead by the two uninjured officers. Both of the wounded police officers had been on the job for only four months. While attempting to shoot Thompson, the officers also wounded a female civilian who was struck in the lower back by a stray bullet.

Victims
25-year-old police officer Kenneth Healey was critically wounded after Thompson's hatchet struck the side of his head and fractured his skull. Officer Joseph Meeker, 24, also suffered a slash wound to the right arm. In addition, a 29-year-old civilian woman suffered a gunshot wound in her lower back, which was inflicted by a stray bullet fired by police officers as they were shooting at Thompson. The woman was initially in critical condition, but was stabilized after doctors performed surgery on her. Officer Meeker was treated at a hospital, but was released on the same day. Officer Healey remained in a Queens hospital, listed in critical but stable condition until October 29, when he left the hospital by ambulance to a rehabilitation facility. He walked the last few steps into the ambulance while being cheered by 200 fellow officers and fans.

Perpetrator

Zale H. Thompson ( 1982 – October 23, 2014), also known as Zaim Farouq Abdul-Malik, was identified as the assailant. He was a graduate of the Rosa Parks Campus in Harlem, an adult-education program of the College of New Rochelle, and attended Teachers College, Columbia University from 2009 to 2010, but left before he could earn a degree. He also served in the U.S. Navy, being involuntarily discharged in 2003. Between 2002 and 2003, he had been arrested six different times in southern California for domestic disputes. When he was sixteen, he was the victim of an assault, although further details about the incident were unclear.

Thompson was described by acquaintances as an advocate of black power and was a recent convert to Islam. He had moved from Brooklyn to Queens before the attack. In the nine months preceding the attack, Thompson visited hundreds of websites regarding designated terrorist organizations. He also made several online posts railing against government, whites, injustices in American society, oppression abroad, and the Western world in general. On Facebook, he had an online conversation with another man regarding the topic of terrorism, although both of them derided the subject. Officials stated that Thompson was not tied to any international extremists or watch lists.

Aftermath
NYPD Commissioner Bill Bratton described the attack as an "act of terror" on October 24. Police officers seized several computers from the home of Thompson's father and searched them.

The attack took place one day after the Ottawa Parliament shootings and three days after the Saint-Jean-sur-Richelieu ramming attack, both of which were carried out by recent converts to Islam, and were described as 
lone wolf terror attacks. Media attention on the Queens attack questioned whether it was motivated by the jihadist group ISIS encouraging sympathizers to carry out terror attacks in their home countries.

See also

2014 shootings at Parliament Hill, Ottawa
2014 Saint-Jean-sur-Richelieu ramming attack
2016 shooting of Philadelphia police officer
2016 shooting of Dallas police officers
Sidewalk clock on Jamaica Avenue

References 

2014 crimes in New York (state)
Anti-police violence in the United States
Attacks in the United States in 2014
Crimes in Queens, New York
Islamic terrorism in New York (state)
Jamaica, Queens
New York City Police Department
October 2014 events in the United States
Stabbing attacks in 2014
Stabbing attacks in the United States
Terrorist incidents in New York City
Terrorist incidents in the United States in 2014
Terrorist incidents involving knife attacks